The Sudbury and District Labour Council is based in Greater Sudbury, Ontario, Canada. It has been affiliated with the Canadian Labour Congress since 1957. Its current president is D'Arcy Gauthier of COPE Local 225.

External links
Sudbury and District Labour Council

Trade unions established in 1957
Trade unions in Ontario
Organizations based in Greater Sudbury
Trades councils
Labor relations